Emily Perry (October 18, 1985) is a Democratic former member of the Kansas House of Representatives, representing the 24th district. Perry opposed a Kansas law passed in 2013 that attempted to nullify federal gun laws, on the grounds that it was unconstitutional. Perry did not seek re-election in 2014.

2013–2014 Kansas House of Representatives Committee assignments:
Ranking Minority Member of Transportation
Federal and State Affairs
Judiciary

References

External links
 
Legislative page

Living people
Democratic Party members of the Kansas House of Representatives
People from Mission, Kansas
Women state legislators in Kansas
Miami University alumni
University of Kansas alumni
Kansas lawyers
1985 births
21st-century American women politicians
21st-century American politicians